Samuel Woods (1871 – unknown) was a Scottish footballer who played in the Football League for Stoke.

Career
Woods was born in Glasgow and played for local side Morton before he moved south to England with Stoke. He made one appearance which came in a 4–0 defeat at Bolton Wanderers in October 1896. Afterwards he returned to Greenock Morton.

Career statistics

References

Scottish footballers
Stoke City F.C. players
English Football League players
1871 births
Year of death missing
Footballers from Glasgow
Greenock Morton F.C. players
Date of birth missing
Association football forwards